Postplatyptilia akerbergsi is a moth of the family Pterophoridae. It is known to be from Chile.

The wingspan is about 19  mm. Adults are on wing in January.

References

akerbergsi
Moths described in 1991
Endemic fauna of Chile